Wen Xiao Zheng (born 1981) is a Chinese violist born in Shanghai and he studied at the Reina Sofía School of Music in Madrid.
He is the second prize-winner at the 2008 ARD International Music Competition in Munich, Germany.

References

1981 births
Living people
Chinese classical violists
Musicians from Shanghai